Progoreloye is a rural locality (a selo) in Novolimanskoye Rural Settlement, Petropavlovsky District, Voronezh Oblast, Russia. The population was 135 as of 2010. There are 3 streets.

Geography 
Progoreloye is located 22 km south of Petropavlovka (the district's administrative centre) by road. Novy Liman is the nearest rural locality.

References 

Rural localities in Petropavlovsky District, Voronezh Oblast